Alan Howard (born September 1963) is a British billionaire hedge fund manager and co-founder of Brevan Howard Asset Management LLP. In February 2013, Forbes listed him as one of the 40 highest-earning hedge fund managers. In 2014, he was ranked 53rd on the UK's Sunday Times Rich List. 
According to Forbes, as of 2019, Howard's net worth is $1.6 billion.

Early life and education
Born in England to a Jewish family, Howard attended Hasmonean Grammar School, Hendon London. After graduating from Imperial College London with a master's degree in physics, he began his financial career at Salomon Brothers and worked in the ECU eurobond market.

Career
Howard served on the New York Federal Reserve's investor advisory committee on financial markets and is one of a group of financial managers, who on occasion, advised New York Federal Reserve officials on economic policy.

In 2019, Howard stepped down as the CEO of Brevan Howard. He was replaced by then chief risk officer, Aron Landy.

In 2020, Howard backed hedgefund One River Digital Asset Management in their purchase of more than $600 million worth of Bitcoin and Ethereum. The fund has commitments that will bring its total holdings of the cryptocurrencies to approximately $1 billion in 2021.

Personal life
He was married to Sabine Howard, who is French, and they have four children. They divorced in 2015. He married Caroline Byron in January 2020.

In 2010, Howard moved from London to Geneva, Switzerland. Five years later, he purchased a $14.5 million condo in Miami, Florida.
In 2017, he returned to London.

Howard has been active in Conservative Party circles.

Howard founded the Alan Howard Charitable Foundation which until closing in 2010 contributed to charities that focused on Israel,  Holocaust education and the homeless. Howard continues to support homeless charities.

In 2014, Howard started The Alan Howard Foundation/JW3 Speaker Series, which is a collection of conversations, talks, and entertainment by leaders and experts in their respective fields. Each event is intended to raise money for the JW3 centre in London.

In December 2019, Reuters reviewed documents of the Cypriot government which show that Howard requested Cypriot citizenship in 2018.

Lady Gaga performed at his wedding to Caroline Byron.

References

External links
  Bloomberg, March 2009
 Bloomberg, January 2012

1963 births
Living people
English Jews
Alumni of Imperial College London
British hedge fund managers
English financial businesspeople
Jewish British philanthropists
British expatriates in Switzerland
British billionaires
Conservative Party (UK) donors
People from Hendon
People associated with cryptocurrency